The title Leader of the Conservative Party may refer to:
Leader of the Conservative Party (UK)
Leader of the Conservative Party of Canada
Leader of the Conservative Party of New Zealand
Leader of the Conservative Party of Norway

See also
Conservative Party (disambiguation)
Conservative Party leadership election (disambiguation)
Deputy Leader of the Conservative Party (UK)